Carbide chlorides are mixed anion compounds containing chloride anions and anions consisting entirely of carbon. In these compounds there is no bond between chlorine and carbon. But there is a bond between a metal and carbon. Many of these compounds are cluster compounds, in which metal atoms encase a carbon core, with chlorine atoms surrounding the cluster. The chlorine may be shared between clusters to form polymers or layers. Most carbon chloride compounds contain rare earth elements. Some are known from group 4 elements. The hexatungsten carbon cluster can be oxidised and reduced, and so have different numbers of chlorine atoms included.

The carbide chlorides are a subset of the halide carbides, with related compounds including the carbide bromides, and carbide iodides. Cluster compounds similar to these carbides, may instead replace carbon with boron, hydrogen, nitrogen or phosphorus.

List

References

Carbides
Chlorides
Mixed anion compounds